Biz Burada Yok İken is the sixth album by the Turkish band Replikas. All songs on this project were covered by the band. It is a collection of the music style Anatolian rock taken from the 1960s and 1970s in Turkey.

Track listing
 Aya Bak Yıldıza Bak
 Kaleden Kaleye Şahin Uçurdum
 Köprüden Geçti Gelin
 Hudey Hudey
 Kaşık Havası
 Bir Ayrılık Bir Yoksulluk Bir Ölüm
 Ölüm Allahın Emri
 Çiçek Dağı
 Suya Giden Allı Gelin
 Panayır Günü
 Sür Efem Atını

Personnel
Gökçe Akçelik - vocals, guitar
Selçuk Artut - bass guitar
Orçun Baştürk - drums
Barkın Engin - guitar
Burak Tamer - synthesizers
Cahit Berkay - yaylı tambur in Ölüm Allahın Emri
Tunçay Korkmaz - harmonica in Kaleden Kaleye Şahin Uçurdum
Ece Özey - vocals in Hudey Hudey & Suya Giden Allı Gelin

References

2012 albums
Replikas albums